Vleuten-De Meern is a former municipality in the Dutch province of Utrecht. It was created in a merger of Haarzuilens, Veldhuizen, Vleuten and a part of Oudenrijn in 1954, and existed until 2001, when it was merged with Utrecht to become a city part of it.

References

Municipalities of the Netherlands disestablished in 2001
Former municipalities of Utrecht (province)
Districts in Utrecht (city)